São Domingos is both a Sector and a city in the Cacheu Region of Guinea-Bissau. The sector also contains the main border checkpoint to Senegal at Jegue (on the Guinean side), Mpack on the Senegalese. In 2016 it was announced that this border crossing would be significantly developed with funding from the UEMOA.

Notes

Cacheu Region
Guinea-Bissau–Senegal border crossings
Sectors of Guinea-Bissau
Populated places in Guinea-Bissau